The 200th Division was the first mechanised division in the National Revolutionary Army. It was created in 1938 by General Du Yuming, who was also its first commander. Its first action was against the Japanese 14th Division in the Battle of Lanfeng.

Original organization (January 1938) 
200th Division
1149th Regiment (Tank Regiment)
1150th Regiment (Tank Regiment)
1151st Regiment (Armoured Car Regiment)
1152nd Regiment (Mechanized Infantry)
52nd Artillery Regiment

Equipment 
The Tank regiments had 70 T-26, 4 BT-5, 20 ( 92? ) CV-33 tanks, AMR 35 tanks. The armoured car regiment had around 50 BA armoured cars and 12 ( 18? ) Leichter Panzerspähwagen (Sd Kfz 221) armoured cars.  Besides, it had more than 400 Ford trucks.  The motorised infantry regiment used Soviet trucks and rifles, and the artillery regiment had 12 122 mm howitzers, also 45 mm anti-aircraft artillery and 75 mm field guns.

Following the Divisions combats in May in the Battle of Lanfeng and in operations afterward until September 1938, the division's original subordinate mechanized units were placed under direct command of the 5th Army, and the division was reorganized as a motorised infantry division of about 9000 men due to the June 1938 reorganization of Divisions.

Organization (October 1938)
200th Division (Major-General Dai Anlan) 
598th Regiment
599th Regiment
600th Regiment

It was next sent as reinforcement to the first Battle of Changsha but was never engaged. The armoured and artillery Regiments were placed under direct command of 5th Army and the 200th Division became a motorized Infantry Division within the same Army with the 1st Honor Division. The 200th Division participated with 5th Corps against the Japanese invasion of Guangxi, in the defense of Nanning, and in the devastating victory against the Japanese in the Battle of Kunlun Pass, wiping out an entire Japanese brigade. It suffered heavy losses after the battle at Kunlun Pass in an offensive against Batang, losing nearly two-thirds of its strength.

Rebuilt and reorganized, the division participated in the Battle of Yunnan-Burma Road in early 1942 and in the Burma campaign. The 200th Division distinguished itself in fighting in the Battle of Toungoo and the Battle of Hopong - Taunggyi but suffered a disastrous defeat in the Battle of Hsipaw-Mogok Highway near the end of the campaign as it was attempting to retreat to China. Its commanding officer, Dai Anlan, died of wounds suffered in that battle while being carried by the remnants of his force as it made its way back to China.

Sources 
  Elite Troops of the National Revolutionary Army, the 200th Division

Divisions of the National Revolutionary Army
C